Tomás Segovia (21 May 1927 – 7 November 2011) was a Mexican author, translator and poet of Spanish origin. He was born in Valencia, Spain, and studied in France and Morocco. He went into exile to Mexico, where he taught at the Colegio de México and other universities. Segovia founded the publication Presencia (1946), was director of La Revista Mexicana de Literatura (1958–1963), formed part of the magazine Plural, and collaborated in Vuelta.

In honour of the poet, in August 2012, Conaculta (the Mexican Council for National Culture and Arts) announced the $100,000 Tomás Segovia Literary Translation Prize, to be awarded in alternating years for the best translation into Spanish or from Spanish.

Works
His work as a poet is not separate from his literary criticism and works of translation. Notable books of poetry include La luz provisional (1950), El sol y su eco (1960), Anagnórisis (1967), Figura y secuencias (1979) and Cantata a solas (1985). Prose works include: Contracorrientes (1973), Poética y profética (1986) and Alegatorio.

At the time of his death he resided in Madrid, Spain.

Awards
Segovia won the Xavier Villaurrutia Prize in 1972, the Juan Rulfo Prize in 2005, and the Premio García Lorca in 2008.

Films
La primera segunda matriz (1972). Mexican filmmaker Alfredo Gurrola made this critically acclaimed short film based in the Segovia's poem of the same name. The film includes the narration by Juan José Gurrola, images of the Avándaro festival and music by avant-garde composers Ligeti, Stockhausen, Luigi Nono among others.

References

1927 births
2011 deaths
Mexican male poets
Mexican male writers
Spanish male writers
Spanish poets
Mexican dramatists and playwrights
Mexican translators
Writers from the Valencian Community
Translators of Jacques Lacan
National Autonomous University of Mexico alumni
International Writing Program alumni
Academic staff of El Colegio de México
Academic staff of the National Autonomous University of Mexico
English–Spanish translators
French–Spanish translators
Naturalized citizens of Mexico
Exiles of the Spanish Civil War in Mexico